Oliver Vachell (c. 1518 – 24 May 1564), of Buriton, near Petersfield, Hampshire and North Marston, Buckimghamshire, was an English politician.

Family
Vachell was married by 25 August 1537 to Margaret, a daughter of Richard Norton of East Tisted, Hampshire. They had two sons and four daughters.

Career
He was a Member (MP) of the Parliament of England for Hindon in October 1553 and Taunton in April 1554. He was an associate of Stephen Gardiner, Bishop of Winchester.

References

1518 births
1564 deaths
English MPs 1553 (Mary I)
English MPs 1554
People from Buriton